Tranosema is a genus of parasitoid wasps belonging to the family Ichneumonidae.

The species of this genus are found in Europe and Northern America.

Species:
 Tranosema atramentarium (Schmiedeknecht, 1909) 
 Tranosema carbonellum (Thomson, 1887)

References

Ichneumonidae
Ichneumonidae genera